Darren Douglas McCarty (born April 1, 1972) is a Canadian former professional ice hockey forward, best known for his years playing with the Detroit Red Wings of the National Hockey League (NHL). McCarty has been known for taking on the role of the Red Wings enforcer most of his career, a role in which he won the Stanley Cup four times in 1997, 1998, 2002, and 2008, the last of which after resurrecting his career in the Red Wings minor league system.

McCarty spent much of his childhood in the small town of Leamington, Ontario, playing for the Southpoint Capitals (OMHA) minor teams.

Playing career

Belleville Bulls
McCarty played for the Belleville Bulls of the Ontario Hockey League from 1989 through 1992. As captain of the team during the 1991-92 season, McCarty recorded 55 goals and 72 assists for 127 points in 65 games. He was awarded the Jim Mahon Memorial Trophy as the top scoring right winger.

Detroit Red Wings

Drafted in the 2nd round, 49th overall, by the Red Wings in the 1992 NHL Entry Draft, McCarty scored 26 points in his rookie season as the Wings won the Central Division title. In the 1996–97 NHL season, McCarty scored a career best 19 goals and 42 points as the Wings swept the Philadelphia Flyers for their first Stanley Cup in 42 years. McCarty scored the Cup-clinching goal in Game 4. This goal, scored on an inside-outside move around a Flyers' defenseman (Janne Niinimaa), and goalie (Ron Hextall), was honored as one of the best goals of the year.

From the 1997–98 season until his departure from the team, McCarty was part of Detroit's famous Grind Line with center Kris Draper and winger Kirk Maltby, which was often matched up against the opponent's top offensive line.

One of McCarty's most infamous moments was in the famous "Fight Night at the Joe" on March 26, 1997, where a massive brawl broke out between the Colorado Avalanche and Red Wings. McCarty stunned Avalanche right winger Claude Lemieux with a blistering punch, and continued punching Lemieux while Lemieux "turtled" his body to avoid damage. The fight was revenge for a hit that Lemieux inflicted on Kris Draper in the previous years playoffs that caused significant injuries to Draper. The fight was also considered as what had broken the curse over the Red Wings, as the Red Wings went on to win their first Stanley cup in over 40 years. McCarty also scored the overtime winning goal to make it 6-5.

In the 2002 Stanley Cup Playoffs, McCarty registered his first hat-trick in Game One of the Western Conference Finals against the Colorado Avalanche's Patrick Roy. McCarty scored four goals in the series, a career best. Detroit won the series and eventually a third Stanley Cup in six years.

Calgary Flames
After 11 seasons with the Red Wings, McCarty and the team parted ways as the lockout cancelled the 2004–05 NHL season. McCarty's contract was bought out by the Red Wings as a result of the newly implemented salary cap. He then signed as a free agent with the Calgary Flames on August 2, 2005. He scored seven goals for the Flames during the regular season. He scored the overtime winning goal in Game 1 of the Flames first round series against the Mighty Ducks of Anaheim, a series Calgary would eventually lose in 7 games. In the 2006–07 season, McCarty appeared in only 32 games and for the first time in his career, failed to register a point.

Flint Generals
On December 31, 2007, the Flint Generals of the International Hockey League announced that McCarty had signed with the team.  The Generals are co-owned by McCarty's former Grind Liner, Kris Draper, who encouraged McCarty to make a comeback to professional hockey. McCarty made his home debut for the Generals on January 12, 2008 and recorded one assist in the 4–3 victory. In ten games with the Generals, McCarty had three goals, two assists, and thirty penalty minutes.

Grand Rapids Griffins and return to the Red Wings
On January 30, 2008, The Grand Rapids Press reported that McCarty would sign a professional tryout contract with the Grand Rapids Griffins. On February 4, 2008, this was made official. On his Griffins debut at Van Andel Arena, he tallied a hat trick and added an assist to power Grand Rapids to a 6–3 win over the Lake Erie Monsters.

On February 25, McCarty signed a one-year contract with the Red Wings and was called up on March 7. Facing Nashville in the opening round of the 2008 playoffs, McCarty scored the opening goal in Game Two, a 4-2 Detroit win. The Red Wings eventually won the Stanley Cup in June 2008, McCarty's fourth championship with the team. McCarty signed a one-year contract with the Wings in the offseason. Because he played in the 2008 Stanley Cup Finals, he qualified to get his name included on the cup a 4th time.

On November 18, the Red Wings placed McCarty on waivers, knowing he would not be claimed.  McCarty cleared waivers and remained with the team. After being sent to Grand Rapids for one game, McCarty was soon recalled. He played 13 games in the 2008-2009 season scoring one goal and 25 penalty minutes. McCarty later suffered a groin strain which landed him on injured reserve in late November. On February 24, 2009 the Detroit Red Wings reassigned McCarty to the Grand Rapids Griffins, after being activated from the injured reserve list. There, he played in 19 games for the Griffins, scoring 5 goals and 6 assists while also collecting 21 penalty minutes. During the Griffins' playoff run McCarty scored 3 goals, 1 assist and 8 penalty minutes in 10 games. After the Griffins were eliminated in the playoffs by the Manitoba Moose, McCarty was recalled by the Red Wings along with several other Griffins players on May 10.   

On July 1, 2009, McCarty became an unrestricted free agent. One week later, Red Wings' general manager Ken Holland stated that the team would likely move on from McCarty.

Retirement 
On December 7, 2009 McCarty officially retired, and had already accepted a job as color analyst for Versus. A fifteen-season veteran and fan favorite in Detroit, McCarty thanked the Red Wings and Flames organizations as well as the fans for helping him to realize his dream.

Broadcasting
On November 23, 2009 McCarty made his debut as an NHL Analyst for Versus.  McCarty made occasional appearances on the Versus post game show, Hockey Central. McCarty served as a fill-in co-host on WXYT-FM (97.1 The Ticket) in Detroit.

McCarty appeared on the January 24, 2012 episode of the truTV reality series Hardcore Pawn, where he appeared with a friend who was trying to sell an alligator hide. Later, American Jewelry and Loan owners Les and Seth Gold and tru TV hired McCarty to do some cameo appearances on the show.

McCarty started his weekly podcast, Grind Time with Darren McCarty, in December 2018.  He broadcast weekly from Radio for One Studios featuring guests to discuss topics ranging from hockey to music to life's journey to legalization of cannabis. The "Grind Time with Darren McCarty" team consist of his Co-Host Perry Vellucci and Executive Producer / Business Manager Nick Antonucci, which has joined Woodward Sports Network in Birmingham, MI as of January 2021.

Personal life

McCarty's father, Craig, was diagnosed with multiple myeloma, an incurable cancer of the bone marrow and blood, in 1995. In 1997, Darren McCarty established the McCarty Cancer Foundation to raise funds to finance research for a cure of this type of cancer.

During the early 2000s he was part of an investigative journalism piece for Rob Wolchek of WJBK-TV Fox 2 News in Detroit, Michigan, in which a self-proclaimed masseuse fabricated family ties to McCarty in an attempt to further garner clientele from the local area while practicing without any certifications.

During the offseason, McCarty is the lead singer for hard rock band "Grinder" which has been in hiatus with the sudden passing of their bass player and friend, James B. Anders from cardiomyopathy.

McCarty appeared on the 2005 ESPN game show Teammates with his teammate on the Red Wings at the time, Brendan Shanahan.

McCarty has four kids with first wife, Cheryl: Griffin, Emerson, Avery, and Gracyn.

In 2012, McCarty wed long time girlfriend Sheryl Sirmons. He lives in Clawson, Michigan.

McCarty's autobiography, My Last Fight: The True Story of a Hockey Rock Star, was released on December 1, 2013 by Triumph Books.

McCarty is a proponent for the legalization of cannabis.  He credits cannabis with helping him overcome his alcohol addiction.

McCarty now occasionally appears and wrestles for pro wrestling company ICW No Holds Barred. He was brought in to feud with current pro wrestlers Brandon Kirk and Kasey Kirk.

Awards
 1992: Ontario Hockey League First All-Star Team
 1992: Jim Mahon Memorial Trophy
 1997, 1998, 2002, 2008: Won the Stanley Cup with the Red Wings
 1998: ESPY Award NHL Play of the Year
 2003 Named the winner of the NHL Foundation Player Award

Career statistics

References

External links

Detroit Red Wings profile page
Darren McCarty - ESPY Nominated Goal on Youtube
McCarty vs. Lemieux on Youtube

1972 births
Living people
Adirondack Red Wings players
Belleville Bulls players
Calgary Flames players
Canadian ice hockey right wingers
Canadian people of Irish descent
Detroit Red Wings draft picks
Detroit Red Wings players
Flint Generals players
Grand Rapids Griffins players
Sportspeople from Burnaby
Ice hockey people from Ontario
People from Leamington, Ontario
Stanley Cup champions
Ice hockey people from British Columbia
People from Clawson, Michigan
American cannabis activists
21st-century Canadian male singers